Counties 1 Western North (known as Counties 1 Tribute Western North for sponsorship purposes) is an English rugby union league.  Originally a single division called Western Counties, in 1996 the division split into two regional leagues called Western Counties North and Western Counties West. Western Counties North was renamed Counties 1 Western North prior to the 2022–23 season and is currently a seventh tier league for clubs based in the south-west of England; mainly Bristol, Gloucestershire and Somerset. The champions are promoted to South West 1 West and the runner-up plays the second team in Western Counties West, with the winning team gaining promotion. The number of teams relegated depends on feedback following promotion and relegation in the leagues above, but is usually two or three to Gloucester Premier and Somerset Premier. Although 2nd XV rugby is part of the Somerset regional league system, only 1st XV teams are allowed in Tribute Western Counties North.

The current champions are Matson and they are promoted to Regional 2 Tribute Severn. Due to the reorganisation of the leagues, Cheltenham, Chosen Hill Former Pupils, Gordano and Winscome are also promoted. There is no relegation and the eight remaining teams, along with four promoted teams form the new level 7 Counties 1 Tribute Western North.

Teams also participate in the RFU Intermediate Cup – a national competition for clubs at level 7 - with all clubs affiliated with the Gloucestershire RFU involved and a representative being sent from the Somerset RFU.

Format
The champions are promoted to South West 1 West and the second-placed team plays the runner-up from Western Counties West with the winner also promoted. The teams finishing in last two or three places are relegated to the Gloucester Premier or Somerset Premier. The season runs from September to April and comprises twenty-six rounds of matches, with each club playing each of its rivals, home and away. The results of the matches contribute points to the league as follows:
 4 points are awarded for a win
 2 points are awarded for a draw
 0 points are awarded for a loss, however
 1 losing (bonus) point is awarded to a team that loses a match by 7 points or fewer
 1 additional (bonus) point is awarded to a team scoring 4 tries or more in a match.

2021–22

Participating teams

League table

2020–21
Due to the ongoing coronavirus pandemic the season was cancelled.

2019–20

Participating teams

2018–19

Participating teams

Promotion play-off
In the play-off for promotion, Midsomer Norton played Crediton from Western Counties West for promotion to South West 1 West. Midsomer Norton had the best playing record and hosted the match, losing 15 – 19. This was the first time either team had participated in the play-offs, at this level, and Crediton's win was the sixth time the away team had won match. Teams from Western Counties North lead 10–9 in the nineteen play-off matches played since 2001.

2017–18
The season started on 2 September and the final league matches were due to be completed by 21 April 2018, with the promotion play-off the following week.

Participating teams

Promotion play-off
Each season, the runners-up in Western Counties West and Western Counties North, participate in a play-off for promotion to South West 1 West. The team with the best playing record, in this case Chew Valley, host the match, and for the second successive season they lost, this time to Devonport Services 12 – 22. It is the first time Devonport Services are promoted to a level six league. This match was the eighteenth play-off for promotion; the northern sides lead with ten victories to the west's eight and the home teams are leading thirteen to five.

2016–17

Participating teams

League table

Promotion play-off
Each season, the runners-up in Western Counties North and Western Counties West, participate in a play-off for promotion to South West 1 West. The team with the best playing record, in this case Chew Valley, host the match and they lost to their opponents Cullompton 12 – 29.

2015–16
The 2015–16 Tribute Western Counties North consists of fourteen teams; six from Somerset, four from Gloucestershire, three from Bristol and one from Wiltshire. The season started on 5 September 2015 and is finishes on 30 April 2016.

Participating teams and location
Nine of the fourteen teams participated in last season's competition. The 2014–15 champions Coney Hill and runners up Newent (who won their playoff game) were promoted to Tribute South West 1 West while Bristol Saracens and North Bristol were relegated to the Gloucester Premier and Stothert & Pitt to the Tribute Somerset Premier.

Participating teams 2014–15
Avon
Barton Hill
Bristol Harlequins
Bristol Saracens (promoted from Gloucester Premier)
Burnham-on-Sea
Cheltenham
Chew Valley
Chosen Hill Former Pupils
Coney Hill (relegated from Tribute South West 1 West)
Keynsham
Old Bristolians
Newent (promoted from Gloucester Premier)
North Bristol
Stothert & Pitt

Participating teams 2013–14
Avon
Barton Hill
Berry Hill
Bristol Harlequins
Chew Valley (promoted from Tribute Somerset Premier)
Chosen Hill Former Pupils
Cirencester
Drybrook (promoted from Gloucester Premier)
Keynsham (promoted from Tribute Somerset Premier)
Matson
Midsomer Norton
North Bristol
Old Bristolians
Oldfield Old Boys (relegated from Tribute South West 1 West)

Participating teams 2012–13
Avon
Barton Hill
Berry Hill
Bristol Harlequins
Burnham-on-Sea
Chosen Hill Former Pupils
Cirencester
Hornets
Matson
North Bristol
Old Bristolians
Wells
Yatton

Participating teams 2011–12
Barton Hill
Bristol Harlequins
Burnham-on-Sea
Chard
Cirencester
Gordon League
Hornets
Keynsham
Matson
North Bristol
Old Centralians
Stroud
Whitehall
Yatton

Participating teams 2010–11
Barton Hill
Berry Hill
Bristol Harlequins
 Cirencester
Drybrook
Gordon League
Keynsham
Matson
North Bristol
Old Centralians
Stroud
St Mary's Old Boys (SW)
Thornbury
Yatton

Participating teams 2009–10
Barton Hill
Berry Hill
Burnham on Sea
Drybrook
Gordon League
Hornets
Keynsham
North Bristol
Old Centralians
Old Redcliffians
Southmead
Stroud
Thornbury
Widden Old Boys

Original teams
When league rugby began in 1987 this division (known as Western Counties) contained the following teams:

Avon & Somerset Police
Cirencester
Clevedon
Gordon League
Matson
Newquay Hornets
Okehampton
Old Redcliffians
Sidmouth
Tiverton
Truro

Western Counties North honours

Western Counties (1987–1993)
Originally Western Counties North and Western Counties West was a single division called Western Counties (sponsored by Courage), involving teams based in the south-west of England including Bristol, Cornwall, Devon, Gloucester and Somerset. Each team played one match against each of the other teams with the winning team awarded two points; there was one point for each team in a drawn match.  It was a tier 7 league with promotion up to South West 2 and relegation to either Cornwall/Devon or Gloucestershire/Somerset.

Western Counties (1993–1996)
At the end of the 1992–93 season the top six teams from London Division 1 and the top six from South West Division 1 were combined to create National 5 South.  This meant that Western Counties dropped from a tier 7 league to a tier 8 league for the years that National 5 South was active.  Promotion continued to South West 2 and relegation down to either Cornwall/Devon or Gloucestershire/Somerset.  The league continued to be sponsored by Courage.

Western Counties North (1996–2000)
Major restructuring by the RFU at the end of the 1995–96 season saw Western Counties split into two separate leagues, Western Counties North and Western Counties West, which reverted to tier 7 leagues due to the cancellation of National 5 South. Promotion from Western Counties North was to the new South West 2 West division (formerly South West 2) while relegation was to Gloucestershire/Somerset.

Western Counties North (2000–2009)
Western Counties North remained a tier 7 league, with promotion continuing to South West 2 West. Relegation was to either Gloucester Premier or Somerset Premier following the cancellation of Gloucestershire/Somerset at the end of the 1999–00 season. From the 2008–09 season the league sponsor was Tribute.

Western Counties North (2009–present)
Despite widespread league restructuring by the RFU, Western Counties North continues as a tier 7 league, with promotion to South West 1 West (formerly South West 2 West) and relegation to either Gloucester Premier or Somerset Premier. Tribute continue to sponsor the league.

Promotion play-offs
Since the 2000–01 season there has been a one-off promotion play-off game played between the league runners-up of Western Counties North and Western Counties West for the third and final promotion place to South West 1 West, with the team with the superior league record having home advantage in the tie. As of the end of the 2018–19 season the northern sides have been the more successful with ten victories to the west's nine while the home team has won thirteen times compared to the away teams six.

Number of league titles

Coney Hill (4)
Matson (3)
Gordon League (2)
Hornets (2)
Keynsham (2)
Avonmouth Old Boys (1)
Berry Hill (1)
Chard (1)
Cheltenham North (1)
Chew Valley (1)
Cleve (1)
Clevedon (1)
Coombe Down (1)
Dings Crusaders (1)
Drybrook (1)
Gloucester Old Boys (1)
Hartpury College (1)
Launceston (1)
Old Patesians (1)
Old Redcliffians (1)
Penryn (1)
St Mary's Old Boys (1)
Stroud (1)
Taunton (1)
Yatton (1)

Sponsorship
The Western Counties League and South West 2 were part of the Courage Clubs Championship and was sponsored by Courage Brewery from the first season, 1987–88 to season 1996–97. The league was unsponsored until season 2007–08 when St Austell Brewery sponsored South-west based leagues under the Tribute Ale label.

See also
 South West Division RFU
 Gloucestershire RFU
 Somerset RFU
 English rugby union system
 Rugby union in England

Notes

References

7
Rugby union in Bristol
Rugby union in Gloucestershire
Rugby union in Somerset
Sports leagues established in 1987
Recurring sporting events established in 1987